Mrs Thursday is a British television comedy-drama produced by Associated Television.

It stars veteran British actress Kathleen Harrison as Alice Thursday, a Cockney charwoman who inherits £10 million and the controlling interest in a multinational company upon the death of her employer, as well as his Rolls-Royce and Mayfair mansion. Hugh Manning played Richard Hunter, Mrs. Thursday's butler, business advisor, and confidant.
Reg Lye played Bill Lee.

The series was devised by Ted Willis and featured scripts by Jack Rosenthal.

Three series, thirty-eight episodes, of Mrs. Thursday were produced. Series One (13 episodes) was broadcast between March 15 and June 7, 1966; Series Two (13 episodes) between 27 December 1966 and 20 March 20, 1967; and Series Three (12 episodes) between 5 October and 22 December 1967.

Series One is available on DVD. Series Two was released on DVD on 30 September 2013.
Series Three, as of June, 2020, still hasn't been released.

'The Train from Dunrich House' was partly filmed at Stapleford Park, and featured its miniature railway.

Episode list
Series 1 (first broadcast March 15–June 7, 1966)

 A Ride in a Rolls-Royce
 Call Me Madam
 Family Reunion
 Thursday's Child
 Honesty Is the Best Policy
 The Girl from Fuller Street
 The Canvas Jungle
 You Don't Have to Book for Buckingham Palace
 The Snows of Yesteryear
 Hunter's Moon
 The Full Dress Affair
 The Sitting Tenant
 Margate Comes But Once a Year

Series 2 (first broadcast December 27, 1966 – March 20, 1967)
 A Little of What You Fancy
 Changes Over the Counter
 The Train from Dunrich Station
 The Duke and I
 When My Boy Comes Home
 Only Washing and Babies
 We Don't Pay London Prices
 The Answer Is a Lemon
 No Tea for the Tallyman
 Up the Garden Path
 The Old School Tie Up
 A Matter of Time
 Charity Begins at the Ball

Series 3 (first broadcast October 5-December 22, 1967)
 News of a Cruise
 All in the Same Boat
 The Sea, the Sea, the Open Sea
 When in Malaga
 Two of a Kind
 A Genuine Moorish Momento
 Spring Time for Hunter
 Alice Is at It Again
 In the Sea Air
 A Question of Being Entitled
 Everything in Concert
 We Bid You All Goodbye

External links
 
 Mrs Thursday at Television Heaven Link says “No signal! This page has gone off air”

1960s British drama television series
ITV television dramas
Black-and-white British television shows
Television shows produced by Associated Television (ATV)
English-language television shows
1966 British television series debuts
1967 British television series endings
Television shows shot at ATV Elstree Studios